Catalytic oxidation are processes that rely on catalysts to introduce oxygen into organic and inorganic compounds.  Many applications, including the focus of this article, involve oxidation by oxygen.  Such processes are conducted on a large scale for the remediation of pollutants, production of valuable chemicals, and the production of energy.

Oxidations of organic compounds
Carboxylic acids, ketones, epoxides, and alcohols are often obtained by partial oxidation of alkanes and alkenes with dioxygen. These intermediates are essential to the production of consumer goods. Partial oxidation is challenging because the most favored reaction between oxygen and hydrocarbons is combustion.

Oxidations of inorganic compounds
Sulfuric acid is produced from sulfur trioxide which is obtained by oxidation of sulfur dioxide. Food-grade phosphates are generated via oxidation of white phosphorus.  Carbon monoxide in automobile exhaust is converted to carbon dioxide in catalytic converters.

Examples
Industrially important examples include both inorganic and organic substrates.

Catalysts
Oxidation catalysis is conducted by both heterogeneous catalysis and homogeneous catalysis.  In the heterogeneous processes, gaseous substrate and oxygen (or air) are passed over solid catalysts.  Typical catalysts are platinum, and redox-active oxides of iron, vanadium, and molybdenum. In many cases, catalysts are modified with a host of additives or promoters that enhance rates or selectivities.

Important homogeneous catalysts for the oxidation of organic compounds are carboxylates of cobalt, iron, and manganese.  To confer good solubility in the organic solvent, these catalysts are often derived from naphthenic acids and ethylhexanoic acid, which are highly lipophilic.  These catalysts initiate radical chain reactions, autoxidation that produce organic radicals that combine with oxygen to give hydroperoxide intermediates.  Generally the selectivity of oxidation is determined by bond energies. For example, benzylic C-H bonds are replaced by oxygen faster than aromatic C-H bonds.

Fine chemicals

Many selective oxidation catalysts have been developed for producing fine chemicals of pharmaceutical or academic interest.  Nobel Prize–winning examples are the Sharpless epoxidation and the Sharpless dihydroxylation.

Biological catalysis

Catalytic oxidations are common in biology, especially since aerobic life subsists on energy obtained by oxidation of organic compounds by air. In contrast to the industrial processes, which are optimized for producing chemical compounds, energy-producing biological oxidations are optimized to produce energy. Many metalloenzymes mediate these reactions.

Fuel cells, etc
Fuel cells rely on oxidation of organic compounds (or hydrogen) using catalysts.  Catalytic heaters generate flameless heat from a supply of combustible fuel and oxygen from air as oxidant.

Challenges
The foremost challenge in catalytic oxidation is the conversion of methane to methanol.  Most methane is stranded, i.e. not located near metropolitan areas.  Consequently, it is flared (converted to carbon dioxide).  One challenge is that methanol is more easily oxidized than is methane.

Catalytic oxidation with oxygen or air is a major application of green chemistry.  There are however many oxidations that cannot be achieved so straightforwardly.  The conversion of propylene to propylene oxide is typically effected using hydrogen peroxide, not oxygen or air.

References

External links
https://archive.today/20130626171216/https://portal.navfac.navy.mil/portal/page/portal/NAVFAC/NAVFAC_WW_PP/NAVFAC_NFESC_PP/ENVIRONMENTAL/ERB/THERMCATOX
http://www.frtr.gov/matrix2/section4/4-59.html

Catalysis